Las Llanas  is a corregimiento in Los Pozos District, Herrera Province, Panama with a population of 599 as of 2010. It was created by Law 18 of January 24, 2003.

References

Corregimientos of Herrera Province